Alice Betto (born 10 December 1987) is an Italian professional triathlete, National 2010 Elite Champion and National 2009 U23 Champion.

Career

At her international debut, i.e. the first European Cup of the year 2010 in Quarteira, she won the bronze medal and proved to be a match for superstars like Quarteira winner Vanessa Fernandes, who had won the silver medal at the Olympic Games in Beijing, and Quarteira silver medalist Emmie Charayron, the 2009 Junior World Champion.

In Italy, Alice Betto represented the club Triathlon Novara and CUS Pro Patria Milano, although the latter did not mention her among its athletes. In 2011 and 2012, Alice Betto represents DDS Settimo Milanese. In 2010 Alice Betto also took part in the prestigious French Club Championship Series Lyonnaise des Eaux, representing TCG 79 Parthenay. At the opening triathlon in Dunkirk (23 May 2010), i.e. the only triathlon of this circuit Betto attended, she placed 15th among the international elite triathletes and turned out to be the second best runner of her club. Alice Betto studies restauro at the Accademia di Belle Arti di Brera in Milan.

In 2021, she competed in the women's event at the 2020 Summer Olympics in Tokyo, Japan. She also competed in the mixed relay event.

ITU Competitions 
In 2010 Betto took part in four ITU competitions and achieved four top ten positions.
The following list is based upon the official ITU rankings and the Athlete's Profile Page. Unless indicated otherwise, the following events are triathlons (Olympic Distance) and belong to the Elite category.

References

External links
 
 Alice Betto at Fiamme Oro
 Alice Betto's club Triathlon Novara in Italian
 Italian Triathlon Federation in Italian

Italian female triathletes
Living people
1987 births
Triathletes of Fiamme Oro
Triathletes at the 2020 Summer Olympics
Olympic triathletes of Italy
21st-century Italian women